Eitan Mizrahi (born 22 January 1972) is an Israeli former footballer.

His son is Li On Mizrahi footballer.

Career
Mizrahi borned in East Talpiot neighborhood, Jerusalem and joined Beitar Jerusalem's children team when he was 7 years old. He started his senior career with Beitar Jerusalem. He won with her 3 time the Israeli championship.

Honours
 Beitar Jerusalem
Israel championship: 1992–93, 1996–97, 1997–98

References

External links
 
 

1972 births
Living people
Israeli footballers
Footballers from Jerusalem
Beitar Jerusalem F.C. players
Maccabi Herzliya F.C. players
Hakoah Maccabi Ramat Gan F.C. players
Liga Leumit players
Israeli Premier League players
Israel youth international footballers
Association football defenders